Bruchsal was a district (Kreis) in the administrative region of Nordbaden in Baden-Württemberg, Germany.  To the district belonged 5 cities and 33 towns.  The town of Bruchsal was the seat of the district and the license plate code was BR.  Bruchsal district was dissolved as a result of the district reform effective January 1, 1973 when it was merged into the district of Karlsruhe.